Estadio Eduardo Gallardon is a multi-use stadium in Lomas de Zamora, Argentina.  It is currently used mostly for football matches, and is the home stadium of Club Atlético Los Andes.  The stadium has a capacity of 36,542 people, and was built in 1940.

References

Eduardo Gallardon
Club Atlético Los Andes
Sports venues in Buenos Aires Province